There have been 97 women in the Dewan Rakyat since the establishment of the Parliament of Malaysia. In the 15th Malaysian Parliament, there are 28 female representatives, or 13.5% of the body.

Women have had the right to both vote and sit in parliament since 1959 and all states and territories have been represented by a woman in the Dewan Rakyat.

List of female members
This is a complete list of women who have served as members of the Dewan Rakyat, ordered by seniority. This list includes women who served in the past and who continue to serve in the present.

Proportion of women in the Dewan Rakyat

Timeline

References

Parliament of Malaysia

Dewan Rakyat